The 2021 Louisiana Ragin' Cajuns football team represented the University of Louisiana at Lafayette in the 2021 NCAA Division I FBS football season. The Ragin' Cajuns played their home games at Cajun Field in Lafayette, Louisiana, and compete in the West Division of the Sun Belt Conference. They were led by fourth-year head coach Billy Napier. The Cajuns began the season with an away matchup against Big 12's Texas and concluded their regular season at conference and in-state rival Louisiana–Monroe.

Napier was named the head coach of the Florida Gators on November 28. He announced that he would coach in the Sun Belt Championship Game on December 4 before departing. Napier led the Ragin’ Cajuns to their first outright Sun Belt championship win, defeating the Appalachian State Mountaineers, and left the Ragin’ Cajuns on a victorious note. On December 5, the same date as Napier's departure, Louisiana announced that then-offensive coordinator Michael Desormeaux would be promoted to head coach for the team's bowl game and the 2022 season. In his first game, Desormeaux defeated Marshall in the 2021 New Orleans Bowl.

Previous season
The Ragin' Cajuns finished the 2020 season 10–1, 7–1 in Sun Belt play to finish in first place in the West Division for the third consecutive year in the Sun Belt Conference and Conference co-champions in arguably the best finish in the history of the program. The win over Iowa State marked the first victory against a ranked team on the road in team history, the second victory ever against a ranked team, and the highest ranked team ever defeated. The following week, the Cajuns were nationally ranked for the first time since the 1940s, reaching 19th in the AP Poll. During their Week 2 overtime victory against Georgia State, the Cajuns secured their first victory in overtime since the 2005 conference matchup against the Troy Trojans. During Week 14, Louisiana was ranked for the first time ever in the College Football Playoff rankings, at No. 25. This was also the first time the Cajuns had been ranked in the three major college football rankings (No. in the 20 AP Poll, No. 21 in the Coaches Poll, and No. 25 in the CFP rankings). During Week 14, the Cajuns defeated Appalachian State for the first time in school history, bringing their all-time record against the Mountaineers to 1–8.

The Cajuns ended their season by defeating the UTSA Roadrunners in the 2020 First Responder Bowl. Senior RB Elijah Mitchell earned the bowl game MVP. This also marked the first time a Sun Belt team took part in that bowl game.

Shortly before the season began, Offensive Line Assistant Coach D. J. Looney, 31, died of a heart attack while at practice on August 1, 2020.  He was honored at the Week 9 matchup against UAB in his hometown of Birmingham, Alabama, where players all wore Looney's name on their jerseys.

Preseason

Recruiting class

|}
Source:

Award watch lists
Listed in the order that they were released

Preseason

Sources:

Sun Belt coaches poll
The Sun Belt coaches poll was released on July 20, 2021. The Cajuns were picked to finish first in the West Division and first in the conference.

Sun Belt Preseason All-Conference teams

Offense

1st team
O'Cyrus Torrence – Offensive Lineman, SO

2nd team
Levi Lewis – Quarterback, SR
Max mitchell – Offensive Lineman, JR

Defense

1st team
Bralen trahan – Defensive Back, RS-JR

2nd team
Zi'Yon Hill – Defensive Lineman, RS-JR
Lorenzo mccaskill – Linebacker, RS-JR
Eric garror – Defensive Back, JR

Special teams

1st team
Rhys byrns – Punter, JR
Chris Smith – Return Specialist, RS-SO

Personnel

Schedule
The 2021 schedule consists of 6 home and 6 away games in the regular season. The Ragin' Cajuns will travel to Sun Belt foes Georgia Southern, South Alabama, Arkansas State, and Troy. The Cajuns will play host to Sun Belt foes Appalachian State,  Texas State, Georgia State, and Louisiana–Monroe.

The Ragin' Cajuns will host two of the three non-conference opponents at Cajun Field, Nicholls, from NCAA Division I FCS and Ohio of the Mid-American Conference, and will travel to Texas of the Big 12 and Liberty, a FBS Independent.

Game summaries

at Texas

Nicholls

Ohio

at Georgia Southern

at South Alabama

Appalachian State

at Arkansas State

Texas State

Georgia State

at Troy

at Liberty

Louisiana–Monroe

Appalachian State (SBC Championship)

vs. Marshall (New Orleans Bowl)

Rankings

References

Louisiana
Louisiana Ragin' Cajuns football seasons
Sun Belt Conference football champion seasons
New Orleans Bowl champion seasons
Louisiana Ragin' Cajuns football